Domenico Piemontesi (11 January 1903 – 1 June 1987) was an Italian professional road bicycle racer. He is most known for his 12-stage wins in the Giro d'Italia and a bronze medal at the 1927 World Championships.

Victories 

1922 – Gloria
1923 – Atala
1924 – Ancora
1925 – Ancora
 Coppa Giubileo
 Trofeo Morgagni-Ridolfi
1926 – Alcyon-Dunlop
 Giro del Piemonte
 Stages 1 & 2, Giro d'Italia
1927 – Bianchi
 Giro dell'Emilia
 Milano-Modena
 Stage 4, Giro d'Italia
  World Road Race Championship
1928 – Bianchi
 Stages 1, 6, 7, 9 & 12, Giro d'Italia
 Sachsen Tour
1929 – Bianchi
 Stage 12, Giro d'Italia
1930 – Bianchi
 Stage 5, Giro d'Italia
1931 – Bianchi
1932 – Génial Lucifer
 Tre Valli Varesine
 Trofeo Morgagni-Ridolfi
 Stages 3 & 5, Volta a Catalunya
1933 – Génial Lucifer
 Giro di Lombardia
1934 – Maino-Clement
 Giro della Provincia de Milano (with Learco Guerra)
 Circuit des Nations
 Stage 1, Tour de Suisse
1935 – Maino-Girardengo
 Stage 2, Giro d'Italia
1936 – Bianchi
1937 – Bianchi
1938 – Bianchi

References

1903 births
1987 deaths
Sportspeople from the Province of Novara
Italian male cyclists
Tour de Suisse stage winners
Cyclists from Piedmont